Polygonum fowleri, commonly called Fowler's knotweed or Hudsonian knotweed,  is a plant species native to the seashores of the northern part of North America. It has been reported from every Canadian province and territory except Alberta and Saskatchewan, as well as from Maine, Alaska, Washington, Oregon, California, and St. Pierre & Miquelon. It is usually found in gravelly locations along the seacoast.

Polygonum fowleri is a prostrate to ascending herb, often with zigzagged stems. Inflorescences are in the axils of the leaves, each with up to 10 white or pink flowers.

Subspecies
Two subspecies are recognized, treated by some botanists as distinct species:
Polygonum fowleri subsp. fowleri – shores of Atlantic, Pacific, and Arctic Oceans
Polygonum fowleri subsp. hudsonianum (S. J. Wolf & McNeill) Costea & Tardif (= P. hudsonianum (S. J. Wolf & McNeill) H. R. Hinds) – shores of Hudson Bay, the Canadian Arctic Islands, and the Atlantic coast of Labrador, Newfoundland, and Nova Scotia

References

fowleri
Flora of Canada
Flora of the United States
Plants described in 1902